Phyllonorycter turensis is a moth of the family Gracillariidae. It is found in the savannah of the Rift Valley in Kenya.

The length of the forewings is 2.81 mm. The forewings are pale ochreous with light grey shading and with whitish indistinct markings. The hindwings are whitish with light beige shading and a silver shine. Adults are on wing in late May.

Etymology
The specific epithet is derived from the name of the type locality, Turi.

References

Endemic moths of Kenya
Moths described in 2012
turensis
Moths of Africa

Taxa named by Jurate de Prins